Mir Abdul Rasool Mir (Sindhi: مير عبدالرسول مير) (7 April 1950 - 19 December 2019) was an educationist and Sindhi language poet of Pakistan. He was popular in all over Sindh for his romantic poetry. His poems were sung by a number of popular Sindhi singers.

Childhood and Qualifications 
Mir Abdul Rasool Mir was born on 7 April 1950 at village Mehar Ali Khan Talpur, Taluka Gambat, District Khairpur Mirs of Sindh, Pakistan. His father Mir Mehar Ali Khan Talpur was a noble person of his village. He received master's degree in physics from the University of Sindh, Jamshoro. He started his career as a lecturer of physics in Education Department. He retired as a Principal of Sachal Sarmast College Hyderabad Sindh.

Career as a Poet 
He started composing poems at very early age. He was greatly inspired by the poetry of Makhdoom Muhammad Zaman Talibul Moula who was a scholar, poet and spiritual leader of his time. The theme of his poetry was romance, patriotism and brotherhood. A number of popular singers including Abida Perveen, Ashique Nizamani, Humaira Channa, Muhammad Yousif, Waheed Ali and others have sung his songs. Most of these songs have been recorded by Radio Pakistan Hyderabad. His poetry collection titled as Soonhan Wiroonhan (Sindhi: سونهن ورونهن) has been published.

He received a number of awards including the following:

 Burdo Sindhi Award (2005)
 Jamaluddin Bhatti Award (2005)
 Latif Award (2005)
 Sachal Award
 Poet of the year award (2006)

Death 
Mir Abdul Rasool Mir died on 19 December 2019.

References 

1950 births
2019 deaths
Pakistani poets
Writers from Sindh
Sindhi-language poets
Recipients of Latif Award